Daniel Calvo (born 11 July 1979 in Brussels) is a Spanish football striker who plays for Léopold FC. Before playing at Namur, he played one match for Anderlecht and 17 for Charleroi in the Belgian Pro League. He then moved to Kortrijk in 2003, where he stayed until 2010. In this period, he promoted with Kortrijk from the Belgian Third Division back to the Belgian Pro League. After a one-season spell with OH Leuven, he then moved to UR Namur.

References

External links
Guardian Football
Daniel Calvo Panizo on Footballdatabase

1979 births
Living people
Belgian footballers
Belgian Pro League players
Challenger Pro League players
R.S.C. Anderlecht players
R. Charleroi S.C. players
K.V. Kortrijk players
Oud-Heverlee Leuven players
Union Royale Namur Fosses-La-Ville players
Footballers from Brussels
Léopold FC players
Association football midfielders